The spoon class theory refers to the idea that individuals in a country can be classified into different socioeconomic classes based on the assets and income level of their parents, and as a consequence, one's success in life depends entirely on being born into a wealthy family. The term appeared in 2015 and was first widely used among online communities in South Korea.

Origin 
The term is based on the  English idiom "born with a silver spoon in one's mouth". In the past, European nobility often used silver dishes, and children were fed by nannies using silver spoons, which indicated the wealth of the family. In South Korea, this idea was taken further to establish several categories to classify individuals based on their family's wealth.

Spoon classes 
The spoon classes have been identified as follows:
The diamond spoon - within top 0.1% of population, with more than $3.2 million ~ $6.4 million annual salary and more than $16 ~ $32 million in assets.
The platinum spoon - within top 0.5% of population, with more than $1.6million ~ $3.2 million annual salary and more than $8 ~ $16 million in assets.
The gold spoon – within top 1% of population, with more than $800K ~ $1.6 million annual salary and more than $4 ~ $8 million in assets.
The silver spoon – within top 5% of population, with more than $400K ~ $800K annual salary and more than $2 ~ $4 million in assets.
The bronze spoon – within top 10% of population, with more than $200K ~ $400K annual salary and more than $1 million ~ $2 million in assets.
The steel spoon - within top 25% of population, with more than $100K ~ $200K annual salary and more than $500k ~ $1 million in assets.
The wooden spoon - within top 50% of population, with more than $50k ~ 100k annual salary and more than $250k ~ $500K in assets.
The soil spoon – those with $25K ~ 50K  annual salary and more than  $125K ~ $250K in assets.
The dirt spoon – those with less than $25K annual salary and less than $125K in assets.

Sociological analysis 
Hyo Chan Cho, the author of hyper-reality shock, explained that the meaning of gold spoon, which is common in Korea's society, "is related to Jean Baudrillard's simulacrum". He suggested that the gold spoon is included in a simulacrum that doesn't have an origin. Issues of gold spoon celebrities and commercials which made those people idealize changed nonexistence as existence. Regardless of the pros and cons of a gold spoon, it became an important image of their life. He further stated that as our society accepted images like gold spoon which became a hyperreality. We accept media's reproducing images that don't have originals as more than an existence. ‘Simulacrum' means an image without substance, it wields strong influence than an existence.

Young adults preparing for significant life changes such as college, marriage or employment are concerned that they are at a disadvantage. For example, many corporations in Korea require stellar academic performance and for applicants to speak English fluently. Individuals who come from the upper class can advance themselves due to the wealth and power that their parents or family possess. Young people who come from the middle and lower class are at a disadvantage because often they are expected to work and attend school, coupled with the fact that they are not being provided with the same monetary support as their wealthier peers. This economic polarization not only influences employment but also affects other things like marriage. The causes of inequality in this society are economic and the fact that poverty is passed from generation to generation. This inequality is creating new classes in Korean society. However, some people overcome their parent's low economic class. Some people who were raised in wealthy families criticize this as well. Unfairness in Korean society is becoming a burden for young adults and is making the Korean society similar to the one described in the spoon class theory.

Park Jae-wan, a professor at Sungkyunkwan University analyzed spoon class theory in research on social mobility. "The distribution of income in Korea is close to that of advanced countries, considering Gini coefficient, relative income share, income share, and relative poverty rate." "The basis of 'Helos' or 'gold spoon' claims is weak". According to the results of estimating the probability that each income group will remain in the same class for the whole household from 2011 to 12, it is 29.8 per cent for low income class, 38.2 per cent for middle class and 32.0 per cent for high income class. Park Jae-wan suggested, "As the results of the analysis, Korea is still highly likely to move." However, the pace of stratification has been slowing since the financial crisis, mainly because the poverty has been fixed, particularly among the elderly. " He cited the following five causes of Spoon class theory. 1. Youth unemployment 2. Reinforced pass down 3. Government regulation and vested interest 4. Relative tendency and relative deprivation of Koreans 5. Bad social capital.

Han Jun, professor of sociology at Yeonsei University said, "Raising the possibility of social mobility is also an important task in terms of social vitality and social integration." It requires policy efforts to care for the physical and mental health of low-income vulnerable children, academic aspirations, and cognitive abilities, Emphasis should be given to schools in low-income vulnerable groups and rural areas. "

Lee Byeong-hoon, professor of sociology at Chung-Ang University, said, "Negative and critical perceptions of opportunistic inequality in our society seem to be influenced by factors such as hierarchy status and experience of discrimination." According to the analysis, the subject and parental generations have low subjective status, experience of discrimination and disadvantages, and younger and higher educated people have higher negative and critical perception of opportunity inequality. In addition, the perception of socioeconomic opportunity inequality, the severity of inequality in opportunity, and the negative perception of effort achievement were found to be higher in the order of lower income class, middle class, and higher income class.

Statistics 

In the 1980s, the share of assets contributed by gifts and inheritance was 27 per cent, age groups spanning 19 to 75 years old: 181 men born between 1940 and 1959, the generation of industrialization; 593 men born between 1960 and 1974, the generation of democracy; and 568 men born between 1975 and 1995, the information generation.

The results of the poll found that the spoon class theory not only existed in Korea but deepened with each successive generation. The study showed that the persistence of poverty across generations has deepened, with 50.7 per cent in the youngest generation answering that both father and son were in the lower class – an increase of almost 15 per cent from the 36.4 per cent who answered the same in the democracy generation. 

In the oldest generation, only 35.9 per cent answered that both father and son were considered in the lower class.

CEO Score Daily '(2017) analyzed the assets fluctuation of 2007 ~ 2017 among the 160 wealthy stockholders of Korea, the United States, Japan and China (for each of the top 40) announced by Forbes. As a result, There are 48 (30 per cent) rich men in the four countries, and the wealthy self-And 112 patients (70 per cent). In Korea, 25 out of 40 equity holders (62.5 per cent) were 'Gold Spoon' It is much higher than that of the US (25 per cent), Japan (12 per cent) and China (2.5 per cent)

"As a result of analyzing the percentage of social movements by generation," said Han Jun, a professor of sociology at Yonsei University, "social movements decreased slightly from 85 percent to 81 percent compared to 20 years ago." According to the analysis, the younger generation (born in 1987–1994) compared to the young people in the 1990s (1966–75) had a 12 per cent decrease in the percentage of upward movements that gained a better job than their parents, The mobility rate has increased by about 8 percentage points, and social mobility has changed negatively. Professor Han Jun pointed out, "The problem is that the decrease in the mobility opportunity that I feel subjective is bigger than the actual one." According to the National Statistical Office (NSO), the negative perception of upside potential is 22 per cent more than 10 years ago (from 29 to 51 per cent) as of 2015.

Korea's income mobility was the eighth highest among the 17 OECD member countries. Korea's income mobility is not relatively low, said Lee Jin-young, an assistant researcher at the Korea Economic Research Institute. According to the analysis of the inter-generation income elasticity of OECD member countries, Korea's income elasticity is 0.29, similar to New Zealand (0.29) and Sweden (0.27). On the other hand, Japan was higher than Korea with 0.34, 0.47 in the US and 0.32 in Germany.

Criticism 
In 2015, Korean society entered into a new class era as inequality increased.  According to Global Attitudes Survey conducted by Pew Research Center, Korean citizens answered that the most threatening thing for them is inequality. However, the conclusion that inequality has a similar effect for all cultures should not be automatically assumed, since at least "8 other countries were content with inequality", including Greece. In contrast, Japan answered that nuclear weapons and radioactivity are most threatening. The results of this survey shows that the awareness of inequality is much higher than nuclear accidents and environmental pollution.

See also
Hell Joseon
Lottery of birth
Sampo generation

References

External links 

2015 establishments in South Korea
2015 neologisms
Korean caste system
Korean culture
Social class in Asia
Sociological theories